The São Tomé and Príncipe Super Cup (Portuguese: Super Taça de São Tomé e Príncipe) is a Super Cup competition played during the season in São Tomé and Príncipe.  The competition is governed by the São Toméan Football Federation (FSF). The competition is also known for recent seasons as the António Aguiar National Super Cup (Supertaça Nacional Antònio Aguiar). The first super cup competition began in 1996.The regional champion competes with the cup winner.  Sometimes, if a champion also has a cup title, a cup club who is runner-up qualifies.  It is the only super cup competition in the country as there are no regional super cup competitions.

Its first of two participants came from São Tomé who competed in the first edition and were the first island to have a title.  The first participant from Príncipe was Sundy who competed in the 2010 edition. It is the only national competition where all of the winners are from the island of São Tomé.

Title history
Sporting Praia Cruz won the most numbering five, the only one with more than the title won.  The remaining eight has only a title won.

Inter Bom-Bom was the first winner won in 1995, then was Bairros Unidos in 1996 and Sporting Praia Cruz in 1999 and became the only club to have more than a title won in 2000. 6 de Setembro became the fourth club to win a title in 2010, then Vitória in 2011, Guadalupe in 2012, UDRA in 2014 and recently Porto Real (or Príncipe) in 2017.

Água Grande has more titles won by any other district with 7 titles.  Me-Zochi was the only district won until 1996.  It only had two districts had a titles until 2012 when Lobata was added and lastly Caué from the south in 2014.  Cantagalo and Lembá are the only districts that has no titles. Until April 7, 2018, all of the titles were won by clubs based on São Tomé Island. Príncipe now has a title won with Porto Real winning for the 2017 season with the final played in April 2018.

Between 2001 and 2009, the Super Cup competition was cancelled.

Winners

Performance by club

Performance by island and district

See also
São Tomé and Príncipe Championships
Taça Nacional de São Tomé and Príncipe

References

External links
 São Tomé and Príncipe Cup and Super Cup Winners - rsssf.com

Football competitions in São Tomé and Príncipe
National association football supercups
1995 establishments in São Tomé and Príncipe